The Oklahoma City Thunder is an American professional basketball franchise based in Oklahoma City, Oklahoma. It plays in the Northwest Division of the Western Conference in the National Basketball Association (NBA). It was known as the Seattle SuperSonics from 1967 to 2008. The team plays its home games at the Paycom Center. As of October 2008, the Thunder is currently owned by Professional Basketball Club LLC with Sam Presti as its general manager. The team was formed in 1967. After spending 41 seasons in Seattle, Washington, the SuperSonics moved to Oklahoma City. Owner Clay Bennett, who purchased the team in 2006, sought to get public funding for a new arena in Seattle, or a major renovation of the KeyArena in 2007. After failing to do so, he decided to move the team to Oklahoma City. Seattle sued Bennett's group to enforce the lease that required the team to stay until 2010. The two sides reached a $45 million settlement to pay off the team's lease with KeyArena in July 2008.

There have been 16 head coaches for the Thunder franchise. The franchise won its only NBA championship in the 1979 NBA Finals while coached by Hall of Famer Lenny Wilkens. Wilkens is the only member of the franchise to have been inducted into the Basketball Hall of Fame as a coach. He is also the franchise's all-time leader in regular-season games coached, regular-season games won, playoff games coached, and playoff games won. Wilkens, Paul Westphal, Nate McMillan and Bob Weiss formerly played for the team in Seattle. Former head coach Scott Brooks is the only coach to have won the NBA Coach of the Year Award with the franchise.


Key

Coaches

Gallery

References
General

Specific

Lists of National Basketball Association head coaches by team

Head coaches